Sudar (English: Crash) is a 2008 album by Serbian pop singer Ana Stanić. It was released on March 10, 2008.

The album contains 13 songs and one bonus. One of the producers was popular Serbian hip hop singer and producer Sky Wikluh. Ana Stanić promoted her fifth studio album at the roof of The Army Home in Belgrade, on June 17.

Track list 
 "Sudar" — 3:47
 "Klinka" — 3:16
 "Više nisi moj" (featuring Sky Wikluh) — 3:15
 "Nepopravljiva" — 4:28
 "Ljubav do neba" — 3:53
 "I to je ljubav" — 3:37
 "Hotel" — 3:45
 "Luda" — 3:25
 "Znam" — 3:46
 "Opasan" — 3:20
 "Bežim od sebe" — 3:27
 "Reci mi sve" — 1:14
 "Bioskop" — 4:41
 "Udahni me" — 3:13 (bonus track)

Release history

References

External links 
 Official Website of Ana Stanić
 On: www.discogs.com

2008 albums